Javier "Javi"  Galán Gil (born 19 November 1994) is a Spanish professional footballer who plays for RC Celta de Vigo. Mainly a left-back, he can also play as a left winger.

Career

Early career
Born in Badajoz, Extremadura, Galán represented CD San Roque Badajoz, CP Don Bosco and CP Flecha Negra as a youth. On 20 June 2013, after scoring 12 goals for the latter's Juvenil A squad, he moved to CD Badajoz.

Galán made his senior debut on 15 September 2013, playing the last 30 minutes in a 1–0 home win against CD Solana for the Regional Preferente championship. He scored his first senior goal fourteen days later, netting the last in a 4–1 home routing of EF Emérita Augusta.

Galán helped the Blanquinegros in their promotion to Tercera División during his first campaign.

Córdoba
On 9 July 2015, Galán joined Córdoba CF, being assigned to the reserves also in the fourth tier. Upon arriving, he became an immediate first choice for the B's.

Galán made his professional debut on 12 October 2016, starting as a left back in a 2–1 Copa del Rey away win against Cádiz CF. He made his Segunda División debut on 4 December, starting in a 2–1 win at CF Reus Deportiu.

On 12 December 2016, Galán renewed his contract until 2020. Five days later he scored his first professional goal, netting the first in a 2–1 win at Real Oviedo.

Galán was an undisputed starter during the 2017–18 campaign; converted to a left back by manager Jorge Romero, he went on to score two goals in 40 appearances as his side narrowly avoided relegation.

Huesca
On 29 January 2019, Galán moved to La Liga side SD Huesca on a three-and-a-half-year contract. He made his debut in the top tier on 1 February, starting in a 4–0 home routing of Real Valladolid.

Galán immediately became a regular starter for the side, suffering relegation in his first season but immediately bouncing back as champions in his second. He scored his first goal in the top tier on 6 February 2021, netting the opener in a 1–2 home loss to Real Madrid.

Celta
On 31 July 2021, after suffering another relegation with Huesca, Galán signed a five-year contract with RC Celta de Vigo in the top tier.

Personal life
Galán is physically likened to England international forward Wayne Rooney, with his nickname being Rooney during his youth career and Badajoz.

Honours
Huesca
Segunda División: 2019–20

References

External links

1994 births
Living people
Sportspeople from Badajoz
Spanish footballers
Footballers from Extremadura
Association football defenders
Association football wingers
La Liga players
Segunda División players
Segunda División B players
Tercera División players
Divisiones Regionales de Fútbol players
CD Badajoz players
Córdoba CF B players
Córdoba CF players
SD Huesca footballers
RC Celta de Vigo players